Bweeng is a village located approximately  south west of the town of Mallow, County Cork, Ireland on the R619 regional road. Bweeng is within the Dáil constituency of Cork North-West.

Transportation 
The nearest railway station is Mallow railway station, which is on the Mallow-Tralee and Dublin-Cork railway lines.

Facilities 

St. Columba's Roman Catholic Church holds regular masses. The village also has one pub, a community centre, playing field and walkway.

The village is served by the local primary school, Bweeng National School, which was opened in 1953.

Sport 
Bweeng, along with Dromahane, Lombardstown and Glantane, is represented in Gaelic games by the Kilshannig club. The club's headquarters are O'Connell Park in Glantane.

See also 
 List of towns and villages in Ireland

References

Towns and villages in County Cork